The dunes sagebrush lizard (Sceloporus arenicolus), formerly known as the sand dune lizard and the dunes-sagebrush lizard, Sceloporus graciosus arenicolus, a subspecies of sagebrush lizard), is an insectivorous spiny lizard species which only occurs in the shinnery oak sand dune systems of extreme southeast New Mexico and only four counties in adjacent Texas. Sceloporus arenicolus has the second-smallest range of all lizards in the United States.

Habitat
Their habitat is restricted to semi-stabilized sand dunes which include large networks of shinnery oak (Quercus havardii), short (<2 m) shrubs, and sand sagebrush (Artemisia filifolia) on sloping, sandy topography, where the lizards use "blowouts" as their primary microhabitat. Blowouts are sandy, bowl-shaped interruptions in the shinnery oak sand dune system which look like small meteor craters. The roots of the shinnery oak shrubs provide structure for the dunes sagebrush lizards' burrows, where the lizards retreat from the blowouts when the sand surface is too hot or cold.

Threats
Habitat destruction is their primary threat. Shinnery oak through much of the lizard's range was sprayed with herbicide to clear the land for cattle grazing, and the lizards are now extinct at these locations. The dune systems are also heavily interrupted by oil industry activities. These interruptions allow Mesquite to invade areas where shinnery oak (and dunes sagebrush lizards) were once dominant. While herbicide spraying has been outlawed in the dunes sagebrush lizard's New Mexico distribution, development for the oil industry has not ceased.

Competition from other lizard species may be a threat, as well. Uta stansburiana, the side-blotched lizard, seems to be more of a habitat generalist than the dunes sagebrush lizard, and may be able to take advantage of recent habitat changes, introducing skewed resource competition that is not natural for that ecosystem.

The United States Fish and Wildlife Service proposed listing the dunes sagebrush lizard as endangered under the Endangered Species Act throughout its range in New Mexico and Texas. The final determination was originally due in July 2011, but was delayed to allow the scientific community to continue research to see if the listing was necessary. In June 2012 the Fish and Wildlife Service decided not to list it, citing the "unprecedented commitments to voluntary conservation agreements now in place in New Mexico and Texas" that provide for the long-term conservation of the species.

References

Sceloporus
Reptiles of the United States
Endemic fauna of the United States
Reptiles described in 1972